This is a list of notable members of Theta Chi fraternity.

Armed services

Arts and entertainment

Business and industry

Education

Politics and government

Journalism

Research and space

Athletics

References

Theta Chi
members